ACT-I-VATE was an American webcomics collective based on an original idea by Dean Haspiel and founded by Haspiel and seven other cartoonists. It started out on the blogging platform Livejournal, and then moved to its own dedicated website.

The ACT-I-VATE collective featured serialized graphic novels from over twenty-five hand-picked professional cartoonists (each of whom generally added a new episode weekly), and was updated daily. ACT-I-VATE members included Haspiel, Nick Bertozzi, Michel Fiffe, Dan Goldman, Tim Hamilton, Josh Neufeld, Leland Purvis, Mike Cavallaro, Kevin Colden, Molly Crabapple, Darryl Cunningham, Mike Dawson, Ulises Fariñas, Simon Fraser, Tom Hart, Roger Langridge, Jason Little, Paul Maybury, Warren Pleece, Palle Schmidt, Paul Peart-Smith, Dean Trippe, and Chip Zdarsky.

ACT-I-VATE's artists were unpaid, and produced their work without editorial oversight. ACT-I-VATE was also free to view. In addition to the high-quality comics, the site was known for its vocal community of readers and the lengthy discussion threads between artist and reader.

In 2009, IDW Publishing released The Act-i-vate Primer, a Harvey Award-nominated anthology featuring 16 original comics stories by members of the collective.

History

Origins 
ACT-I-VATE debuted on February 1, 2006, with eight cartoonists, and added four more members on April 5, 2006. The collective gradually added new hand-picked cartoonists at a regular rate to the point the membership reached in excess of 50 creators.

From the web to print 
ACT-I-VATE rose to prominence when many of its artists, including Haspiel, Michel Fiffe, Mike Cavallaro, Dan Goldman, and Nick Bertozzi, began to receive publishing deals. Haspiel and  Fiffe's three-issue mini-series, Brawl, a "creature romance double feature" featuring Haspiel's Immortal (starring Billy Dogma) and Fiffe's Panorama, which both originated on ACT-I-VATE, was published by Image Comics in the Fall of 2007. Similarly, Parade (with Fireworks), by Mike Cavallaro, began on ACT-I-VATE, was first excerpted in New York magazine and was later published by Image.

Act-i-vate members Ulises Fariñas, Michel Fiffe, Dean Haspiel, Tim Hamilton, Dan Goldman, Paul Maybury, and Nikki Cook all had work published in Image Comics' Popgun anthology vol. 2, published in July 2008.

The Act-i-vate Primer 
The Act-i-vate Primer, published in October 2009 by IDW, was edited by Dean Haspiel & Scott Dunbier, and featured a foreword by Warren Ellis. The book's 16 original comics were by Roger Langridge, Mike Dawson, Nick Bertozzi, Tim Hamilton, Dean Haspiel, Pedro Camargo, Mike Cavallaro, Molly Crabapple, Jim Dougan, Ulises Fariñas, Michel Fiffe, Maurice Fontenot, Simon Fraser, Jennifer Hayden, Joe Infurnari, John Leavitt, Hyeondo Park, and Leland Purvis.

The Act-i-vate Primer was covered by, among others, The New York Times, Comic Critique, and Comic Book Resources; and was named to Heeb's top ten comics for the year. It was nominated for a Harvey Award for Best Anthology.

Demise 
In 2015 the site had a serious outage. It was restored from backups, but the hosting company was not able to get it working as it had before. The codebase for the site was out of date and filled with bugs, and the original programmers were no longer able to maintain it.

In 2016, the site administrator (at that point cartoonist Simon Fraser, working on a volunteer basis and with little available resources), came to the conclusion that shutting down the site was the only recourse. The archived site remained at its original URL through 2018 and officially went dead on January 28, 2019.

Titles (selected) 

 Aggro by Simon Fraser
 Ass Meat by Simon Fraser
 Ayn Rand by Darryl Cunningham
 Backstage by John Leavitt and Molly Crabapple
 Barney Banks: Extra Life! by Tom Hart
 Beanbots by Kevin Kobasic
 The Black Feather Falls by Ellen Lindner
 Borb by Jason Little
 Cartoon Boy by John Kerschbaum
 Come the Dawn by Jim Dougan and Hyeondo Park
 Corinthian Diary by Glynnis Fawkes
 Cover Art by Leland Purvis
 Culture Pop by Seth Kushner
 Deja Voodoo by Simon Fraser, Dan Goldman, and Michel Fiffe
 Diaspora by Cristian Ortiz
 Drockleberry by Andrew Dimitt
 Easy Pieces by Neil Dvorak
 The End is Here by Thomas Baehr
 Everywhere by Chris Miskiewicz and Andrew Wendel
 The Falconer by Yana Adamovic (based on a short story by Vladimir Lazovic)
 Farseeker by Dirk Manning and Len O'Grady
 Fear, My Dear by Dean Haspiel
 Fever Dream by Kat Roberts
 Fish Everywhere by Palle Schmidt
 Fishtown by Kevin Colden — Xeric Award-winner
 The Fist by Darryl Cunningham
 Flowing Wells by Andrew Dimitt
 Gang of Fools by James Smith
 Glam by Pedro Camargo
 Ghost Pimp by Maurice Fontenot
 Girl Mercury by Ulises Fariñas
 Golden Campaign by Cristian Ortiz
 The Golem's Voice by David G. Klein
 Hairkut by Dan Goldman
 Hebi no Hadi by Rami Efal
 Hippy Days by Sam Henderson
 How I Built My Father by Rob Davis
 The Homeric Hymn to Dionysos by Glynnis Fawkes
 Immortal by Dean Haspiel
 Iphigenia in Taurus by Glynnis Fawkes
 Jack & Max by Mike Dawson
 Kelly by Dan Goldman
 Lilly MacKenzie and the Mines of Charybdis by Simon Fraser
 Lilly MacKenzie and the Treasure of Pars by Simon Fraser
 Lionel's Lament by Dean Haspiel and Josh Neufeld
 Love & Zombies by Ryan Roman 
 Loviathan by Mike Cavallaro
 Machismo Monitor! by Jim Dougan and Roger Langridge
 A Mess of Everything by Miss Lasko-Gross
 A Mid-Autumn Night's Dream by Robin Ha
 Montague Terrace by Warren Pleece
 Mosquito Beach by Robin Ha
 Motel Art Improvement Service by Jason Little
 Motro by Ulises Fariñas
 Mugwhump the Great by Roger Langridge
 My Family and Other Gypsies by Rob Davis
 Never Forget Never Forgive by Rami Efal
 A New Elegant Universe by Ulises Fariñas
 Nilharity by Shannon Wheeler
 Nombril by Leland Purvis
 Now It Can Be Told by Scott Shaw!
 One Plus One by Paul Peart-Smith
 Orifice by Jen Tong
 Panorama by Michel Fiffe
 Parade (with Fireworks) by Mike Cavallaro
 Party Bear by Paul Maybury
 Pecan Sandy by Nick Bertozzi
 Persimmon Cup by Nick Bertozzi
 Pet Sitter by Tim Hamilton
 Post-Punk & Pirates by Gideon Kendall
 Power Out by Nathan Schreiber
 Pregnant Butch by A. K. Summers
 The Prince and the Pooper by Dov Torbin
 Rest Stop by Jim Dougan and Michel Fiffe
 The Revolution Will Be Televised by Dov Torbin
 Rudolph! by Lucie Arnoux
 Sack of Puppies by Nikki Cook
 Sam & Lilah by Jim Dougan and Hyeondo Park
 Schmuck by Seth Kushner and Kevin Colden
 S'crapbook by Jennifer Hayden
 Sex Planet by Dean Haspiel
 Shrooms by Gideon Kendall
 Sleazy Pizza by Ryan Roman
 Space Sucks by Pedro Camargo
 The Streets of San Diablo by Darryl Cunningham
 The Sultan's Daughter by Glynnis Fawkes
 Tales of the Floating Elephant by Tim Hamilton
 Texas Kid by Igor Kordej
 The Torturer's Garden by Rob Davis
 Troop 142 by Mike Dawson
 ULTRA-Lad! by Joe Infurnari
 Uncle Bob and the Martian Invasion by Darryl Cunningham
 Uncle Bob on Skull Island by Darryl Cunningham
 Underwire by Jennifer Hayden
 Uplift the Postivicals by Tim Hall and Jen Ferguson
 The Vagabonds by Josh Neufeld
 The Voyage of the James Caird by Nick Bertozzi
 Vulcan & Vishnu by Leland Purvis
 Wake by Dean Trippe
 Whatzit by Gideon Kendall
 Zdarsky-verse by Chip Zdarsky
 Zegas by Michel Fiffe

References

External links 
 Official ACT-I-VATE website, archived at the Wayback Machine
 
 The ACT-I-VATE Experience, documentary by Carlos Molina and Seth Kushner

Webcomic publishing companies
American artist groups and collectives
Comics groups and collectives